John Tolmie (August 30, 1845 – February 10, 1916) was a Canadian politician.

Born in Inverness-shire, Scotland, the son of Alexander Tolmie and Mary Fraser, he emigrated to Canada with his parents in 1868 and settled in Bruce Township, Ontario. A salt manufacturer in Kincardine, Ontario, he was Reeve of Bruce Township for four years, Deputy-Reeve of Kincardine for one year, and for two years Mayor of Kincardine. In 1883, Tolmie married Maggie H. Paterson. He was elected to the House of Commons of Canada for Bruce West in 1896. A Liberal, he was re-elected in 1900 but did not run in 1904. He was elected in a 1906 by-election for Bruce North after the death of the sitting MP and was re-elected in 1908. He was defeated in 1911. Tolmie died in Kincardine at the age of 70.

References 

1845 births
1916 deaths
Liberal Party of Canada MPs
Mayors of places in Ontario
Members of the House of Commons of Canada from Ontario
Scottish emigrants to Canada